Jean Dominique Adam (29 December 17956 October 1842) was an illustrious French Archetier /  Bowmaker.

Early life and education
Jean Dominique was born in Mirecourt, the son of Jean Adam (b.1767; d. 1849) who started three generations of bowmakers.

Jean learnt from his father, whose ability he surpassed, and then drew inspiration from Etienne Pajeot and Tourte.

Career
The family were a big influence on younger bowmakers, and Jean Dominique's work was affected by those returning from Paris.

"Both Jean Dominique and his son "Grand" Adam seemed to favour François Tourte's  design (octagonal sticks) and thus produced a great many octagonal bows."

Family
Jean Dominique's son Jean “Grand Adam” bettered his father's skills but moved to Paris, while Jean remained in Mirecourt until his death.

References

The Cambridge Companion to the Cello by Robin Stowell
 
  (see René A. Morel)
 
 
 
 Les Luthiers Parisiens aux XIX et XX siecles Tom 3 "Jean-Baptiste Vuillaume et sa famille - Sylvette Milliot 2006
 
 

1795 births
1842 deaths
Bow makers
19th-century French people
Luthiers from Mirecourt